Asshole or arsehole is a vulgar term for the anus, or an insult derived from this meaning.

Asshole may also refer to:
 Asshole (album), by Gene Simmons
 "Asshole", a song by Gene Simmons from his album, Asshole
 "Asshole" (song), by Denis Leary
 "Asshole", a song by Eminem from his album, The Marshall Mathers LP 2
 "Asshole", a song by Ronnie Radke from his mixtape, Watch Me
 Asshole (EP), an EP by Sebadoh
 Assholes: A Theory, a 2012 non-fiction book by Aaron James
 Assholes: A Theory, a 2019 film directed by John Walker based on the book by Aaron James
 Asshole (card game)

See also
 
 Arsole, arsenic-containing chemical compound